The Ducksters is a 1950 Warner Bros. Looney Tunes theatrical cartoon short, directed by Chuck Jones and written by Michael Maltese. The cartoon was released on September 2, 1950, and stars Daffy Duck and Porky Pig. The title is a pun on the 1947 film The Hucksters.

Synopsis
Porky Pig is on a radio quiz show called Truth or AAAAHHH!!, a somewhat macabre parody of the popular quiz show Truth or Consequences (but with potentially lethal consequences) hosted by Daffy Duck, sponsored by "Eagle Hand Laundry" and broadcast by the Ajax Broadcasting Company, in which the object is to answer near-impossible or ridiculously obscure questions. One such question includes: "Who, mind you WHO, was the referee for the New Zealand heavyweight championship fight in 1726?" (Somehow, Porky actually knew it was "Arbuckle Dreen," and even knew that Dreen's second grade teacher was "Abigail Twitch."  Daffy turns to the audience, and shouts, "NO COACHING, PLEASE!"). Failing to answer the other questions correctly or in time gets him pounded in the head with a mallet and then requires him to "pay the penalty" (for instance, when Daffy asks who was the father of the country, Porky's stuttering prevents him from answering "George Washington" in time). These penalties include Porky being threatened by a buzz saw, blown up with dynamite while trying to name all the (then) 48 states in the U.S., being crushed by a safe, and other forms of abuse, while the prizes for some questions are similar, such as being crushed by a safe, then the Rock of Gibraltar before being rained upon by "genuine" water from Niagara Falls. Porky is unable to ask for clues (for example, when asked what Cleopatra's aunt's maiden name was, he tries to ask whether is looking for her "paternal" or "maternal" aunt, but Daffy tells him to "watch [Porky's] language") and tries several times to back out, but each time Daffy manages to reel him back in, even shooting an audience member when he shouts "You'll be sorry!".

Eventually, after a particularly snide line from Daffy ("Listen, Mac; You've got 32 teeth, would you like to try for 16?," a play on the then-popular game Take it or Leave It), Porky threatens to retaliate, forcing Daffy to offer his final challenge for a huge jackpot. Porky must guess who Miss Shush is with his only clue being a recording of her brushing her teeth on Wednesdays. Porky fails to answer correctly and Daffy invites him into Miss Shush's dressing room to meet her, but Daffy reveals that Miss Shush is really Mamie, a 600-pound gorilla who appears in Obnoxious Pictures' "Jungle Jitters", and who proceeds to viciously and loudly maul Porky. Porky eventually emerges and advances on Daffy menacingly, and Daffy finally gives in, awarding Porky the jackpot of $26,000,000.03. Using a phone, Porky contacts the president of the Ajax Broadcasting Company, who offers to sell the company for the exact amount of the jackpot. Sensing an opportunity to get back at Daffy, Porky willingly accepts the offer.

Now Daffy's boss, Porky takes over the quiz show and then asks a very nervous Daffy: "in what latitude and longitude did the Wreck of the Hesperus occur?" Daffy fails to answer correctly in time, and Porky turns the tables, subjecting Daffy to the same "penalties" Porky had endured. The cartoon ends when Daffy is then tied to the same long plank Porky had been tied to at the start of the cartoon, moving toward the same buzz saw. Daffy lifts his head and yells at the studio audience: "Have you got a doctor in the balcony, lady?!" (this line was a takeoff of another radio quiz show, Doctor IQ, where the announcer would note "I have a lady in the balcony, Doctor" to introduce a new contestant).

Cast
Mel Blanc portrays all voices in this short, including Daffy Duck, Porky Pig and the audience member.

Production details
The cartoon's title is a play on The Hucksters, a satirical novel about the advertising business that was made into a 1947 live-action film starring Clark Gable.

"Eagle Hand Laundry", the business supposedly sponsoring Daffy's radio show, was at the time the name of an actual hand laundry in Brooklyn.

References

External links
 

Looney Tunes shorts
1950 films
1950 animated films
1950 short films
Short films directed by Chuck Jones
Daffy Duck films
Porky Pig films
Films scored by Carl Stalling
Films based on radio series
1950s parody films
Warner Bros. short films
Warner Bros. Cartoons animated short films
1950 comedy films
1950s Warner Bros. animated short films
Films with screenplays by Michael Maltese
1950s English-language films
Films about quizzes and game shows